
IBTC may refer to:
International Beverages Trading
Itty Bitty Titty Committee